Seyrigia may refer to:

 Seyrigia (beetle), a genus of insects in the family Buprestidae
 Seyrigia (plant), a genus of plants in the family Cucurbitaceae